This is a list of notable alumni and faculty of Alfred University, located in Alfred, New York, USA.

Alumni

Academia
Eva Allen Alberti (1856-1938), dramatics teacher
Marvin Bell, poet and author, known for protesting the Afghanistan and Iraq wars through his literary work
Melvil Dewey, librarian, creator of the Dewey Decimal System, who attended in 1870 but did not graduate
Michael Jones McKean, artist and educator whose emphasis on questioning object, time and anthropological norms have garnered international acclaim

Art
Jerry Ackerman (MFA '52), mid-century modern industrial designer and ceramic artist 
Ying Miao , MFA 2009, mixed media contemporary artist 
Robert Archambeau, ceramic artist
Arthur Eugene Baggs, ceramic artist and glaze chemist
R. Guy Cowan, founder, Cowan Pottery
Andrew Deutsch, electronic and sound artist
Minhi Su England, glass artist, contestant on Season 3 of Blown Away
Ken Ferguson, ceramist
Creig Flessel, comic book artist and author
Rob Forbes, ceramist, founder of Design Within Reach, and retailer PUBLIC Bikes.
Julia Galloway, potter and educator
Maija Grotell, ceramist
Vivika Heino (MFA), ceramist, the second M.F.A. graduate from the ceramics program (following Daniel Rhodes)
Ka Kwong Hui (BFA 1951, MFA 1952), potter, ceramist, and educator
Amy Karle, bioartist, provocateur and futurist.
Jae Won Lee, ceramic artist and educator
Charles Loloma, Hopi potter, business owner and director of plastic arts education
Otellie Loloma, Hopi potter, dancer and art educator 
Nathan Lyons (1957), founder, Director Emeritus of Visual Studies Workshop
Kristen Morgin, sculptor
Elizabeth Overbeck, ceramic artist, of the famed Overbeck Sisters 
Kenneth Price, modern ceramic sculptor
Daniel Rhodes, ceramist and noted author on ceramic technique
Adelaïde Alsop Robineau, potter, china painter, one of the top ceramists at turn of the 19th century
Annabeth Rosen, award-winning sculptor
Siona Shimshi, painter, sculptor, ceramist, and textile designer 
Robert C. Turner, ceramist, professor emeritus of ceramic art at Alfred till 1979. 
Betty Woodman, ceramic artist who studied at the School for American Craftsmen when it was located in the liberal arts program at Alfred University in 1948–49.
Arnold Zimmerman, modern sculptor

Business
Robert H. Benmosche 1966, CEO of American International Group; Chairman, Metropolitan Life Insurance Company
Peter Cuneo 1967, Chairman of Cuneo and Co. and Marvel Enterprises, Inc
Mary Lewis Langworthy (1872-1949), dramatic coach, writer, lecturer, clubwoman, and executive
Rodney O. Martin, Jr., Chairman and CEO, Voya Financial
Steven Pressman (economist), economist with extensive experience in poverty and middle-class issues

Entertainment
Chagmion Antoine, openly bisexual American network news journalist
Rob Bartlett, comedian
 Max Davis and Griffin Sherry of the folk rock band The Ghost of Paul Revere
Robert Forster, Oscar-nominated actor ("Jackie Brown"), attended for two years
David Finfer, film editor ("The Fugitive," "Lost In America")
 Eric Harvey, former guitarist and keyboardist for the band Spoon
Bob Keeshan, better known as Captain Kangaroo, received an honorary doctorate from Alfred in 1969
Robert Klein, actor and comedian
Bill Pullman, actor ("While You Were Sleeping," independence Day,"), received an honorary doctorate in 2011; board of trustees member
Alan Uger, Emmy-winning writer-producer of "Family Ties," and two-time Writers Guild Award-winner ("Family Ties," "Blazing Saddles")
Kat Wright, singer and songwriter, who has toured and recorded as Kat Wright & the Indomitable Soul Band

Engineering
Flora A. Brewster (1852-1919), physician, surgeon, inventor
Dr. Lowell Fitz Randolph, plant scientist (crop and plant genetics) and author, (1894-1980)
Van Derck Frechette,  ceramic engineer; Alfred University professor and founder of study-abroad program for the College of Ceramics; internationally recognized expert in fractography; author of numerous books; American Ceramic Society Distinguished Life Member
Samuel Hulbert,  biomedical engineer; pioneer in ceramic devices; president of Rose-Hulman Institute of Technology
Marlin Miller,  ceramic engineer; co-founder of Arrow International medical devices manufacturer and Norwich Ventures, a med-tech venture capital firm; Alfred University Trustee and greatest benefactor
Joel Moskowitz,  ceramic engineer; co-founder of Ceradyne; American Ceramic Society Distinguished Life Member; Alfred University Trustee and major benefactor
L. David Pye,  glass scientist; Alfred University professor; Dean of New York State College of Ceramics; American Ceramic Society Distinguished Life Member and Past President; founding member of the board of trustees of the Ceramic and Glass Industry Foundation, and founding editor of the International Journal of Applied Glass Science 
Clarence W. Spicer, 1891–1894, inventor; businessman; invented a universal joint; founded Spicer Manufacturing, now the Dana Holding Corporation

Literature
Cora Belle Brewster (1859–?), physician, surgeon, medical writer, editor
Ward Churchill, writer and political activist; received an honorary doctorate in 1992
Mary Bassett Clarke (1831–1908), writer
Richard Dolan, author whose works include UFOs and the National Security State
Peter Jenkins, author whose best-selling book A Walk Across America begins in Alfred
Robert Littell, author of nearly twenty spy novels including "The Company," which became a 2007 TV miniseries starring Michael Keaton, as well as "The Defection of A.J. Lewinter" and "The Once and Future Spy" 
Steve Skeates, comic book creator, author and Marvel and DC alum

Politics
Kristin Beck, transgender retired United States Navy SEAL, author, human rights advocate and Democratic candidate to Congress in the 2016 Maryland primaries
Cathy Bissoon, United States District Judge, United States District Court for the Western District of Pennsylvania
William Wallace Brown, United States Congressman from Pennsylvania (1883–87)
Burrows Burdick, Wisconsin physician and legislator
David Chesnoff, Criminal Defense Attorney
George P. Darrow, United States Congressman from Pennsylvania
Dean Fuleihan, First Deputy Mayor of New York City
Rufus Mallory, United States Congressman from Oregon, (1867-1869), Speaker of the Oregon State House, (1872-1873)
Karla Moskowitz, Associate Justice, New York Supreme Appellate Court
Nancy Nadel, City Council member, Oakland, California
Tony Ninos, Democrat who served the Florida House of Representatives
Mike Pellicciotti, American politician and Washington State Treasurer
Tom Reed, United States Congressman from New York, (2010–2022), Mayor of Corning, NY, (2008-2010).
Henry Moore Teller, United States Congressman from Colorado (1876–82, 1885–1909), Secretary of the Interior (1882–85)
Mandana Coleman Thorp (1843-1916), public official
Augustus Everett Willson, Governor of Kentucky (1907-1911)

Sports
Oluwale Bamgbose, professional Mixed Martial Artist, formerly competing in the UFC's middleweight division
Bob Beyer, American basketball head coach
Les Goble, American football player
Bill Schuster, NCAA and National Football League official
Frank Trigilio, American football player
Ray Witter, American football player
Alex Yunevich, American football player and coach

Faculty

Charles Fergus Binns, author, educator and "the father of American studio ceramics"
Andrew Deutsch, video and sound artist, noise musician and educator
Wayne Higby, ceramic artist; known for work in Raku ceramics and large bowl forms
Michael Kay (professor), controversial educator who supported equal rights for students of color
Timothy Z. Keith, award-winning doctor of psychology
Hongwei Li, sculptor, former faculty. works have been exhibited at the Louvre and the Art Institute of Chicago
Walter McConnell, American ceramic artist and ceramics instructor
Daniel Rhodes, American ceramic artist, sculptor, author and educator
Robert Chapman Turner, ceramics artist; founded the ceramics program at Black Mountain College
William Underhill, instructor and sculptor of King Alfred in Alfred University's quad
Arun Varshneya, glass scientist; President’s Award for lifetime achievement from the International Congress on Glass; American Ceramic Society Distinguished Life Member; President and CEO of Saxon Glass Technologies, Inc.

References

List
Lists of people by university or college in New York (state)